A bandgap voltage reference is a temperature independent voltage reference circuit widely used in integrated circuits. It produces a fixed (constant) voltage regardless of power supply variations, temperature changes, or circuit loading from a device. It commonly has an output voltage around 1.25V (close to the theoretical  band gap of silicon at 0K).  This circuit concept was first published by David Hilbiber in 1964.  Bob Widlar, Paul Brokaw and others followed up with other commercially successful versions.

Operation

 
The voltage difference between two p–n junctions (e.g. diodes), operated at different current densities, is used to generate a current that is  proportional to absolute temperature (PTAT) in a resistor. This current is used to generate a voltage in a second resistor. This voltage in turn is added to the voltage of one of the junctions (or a third one, in some implementations). The voltage across a diode operated at constant current is complementary to absolute temperature (CTAT), with a temperature coefficient of approximately −2mV/K. If the ratio between the first and second resistor is chosen properly, the first order effects of the temperature dependency of the diode and the PTAT current will cancel out. The resulting voltage is about 1.2–1.3V, depending on the particular technology and circuit design, and is close to the theoretical 1.22eV bandgap of silicon at 0K. The remaining voltage change over the operating temperature of typical integrated circuits is on the order of a few millivolts. This temperature dependency has a typical parabolic residual behavior since the linear (first order) effects are chosen to cancel.

Because the output voltage is by definition fixed around 1.25V for typical bandgap reference circuits, the minimum operating voltage is about 1.4V, as in a CMOS circuit at least one drain-source voltage of a field-effect transistor (FET) has to be added. Therefore, recent work concentrates on finding alternative solutions, in which for example currents are summed instead of voltages, resulting in a lower theoretical limit for the operating voltage.

The first letter of the acronym, CTAT, is sometimes misconstrued to represent constant rather than complementary. The term, constant with temperature (CWT), exists to address this confusion, but is not in widespread use.

When summing a PTAT and a CTAT current, only the linear terms of current are compensated, while the higher-order terms are limiting the temperature drift (TD) of the bandgap reference at around 20ppm/°C, over a temperature range of 100°C. For this reason, in  2001, Malcovati  designed a circuit topology that can compensate high-order non-linearities, thus achieving an improved TD. This design used an improved version of Banba's  topology and an analysis of base-emitter temperature effects that was performed by Tsividis in 1980. In 2012, Andreou has further improved the high-order non-linear compensation by using a second operational amplifier along with an additional resistor leg at the point where the two currents are summed up. This method enhanced further the curvature correction and achieved superior TD performance over a wider temperature range. In addition it achieved improved line regulation and lower noise.

The other critical issue in design of bandgap references is power efficiency and size of circuit. As a bandgap reference is generally based on BJT devices and resistors, the total size of circuit could be large and therefore expensive for IC design. Moreover, this type of circuit might consume a lot of power to reach to the desired noise and precision specification.

Despite these limitations, the bandgap voltage reference is widely used in voltage regulators, covering the majority of 78xx, 79xx devices along with the LM317, LM337 and TL431 devices. Temperature coefficients as low as 1.5–2.0ppm/°C can be obtained with bandgap references. However, the parabolic characteristic of voltage versus temperature means that a single figure in ppm/°C does not adequately describe the behaviour of the circuit. Manufacturers' data sheets show that the temperature at which the peak (or trough) of the voltage curve occurs is subject to normal sample variations in production. Bandgaps are also suited for low-power applications.

Patents
 1966, US Patent 3271660, Reference voltage source, David Hilbiber.
 1971, US Patent 3617859, Electrical regulator apparatus including a zero temperature coefficient voltage reference circuit, Robert Dobkin and Robert Widlar.
 1981, US Patent 4249122, Temperature compensated bandgap IC voltage references, Robert Widlar.
 1984, US Patent 4447784, Temperature compensated bandgap voltage reference circuit, Robert Dobkin.

Notes

See also
 Brokaw bandgap reference
 LM317
 Silicon bandgap temperature sensor

References

External links
 The Design of Band-Gap Reference Circuits: Trials and Tribulations p. 286 – Robert Pease, National Semiconductor
 Features and Limitations of CMOS Voltage References
 ECE 327: LM317 Bandgap Voltage Reference Example – Brief explanation of the temperature-independent bandgap reference circuit within the LM317.

Electronic circuits
Analog circuits